Alpine is an unincorporated community in DeKalb County, Alabama, United States, located northeast of Fort Payne.

References

Unincorporated communities in DeKalb County, Alabama
Unincorporated communities in Alabama